Earthflight is a British nature documentary that shows a flight from the view of the wings of birds across six continents, showing some of the world's greatest natural spectacles from a bird's-eye view. The BBC series was created by John Downer and narrated by David Tennant and consisted of six 60-minute episodes. The first episode aired on BBC One on 29 December 2011.

A two-hour subset of Earthflight was aired in October 2012 by the Discovery Channel in the US as Winged Planet. The entire series with rerecorded narrative aired on PBS, beginning in September 2013, under the title Earthflight, A Nature Special Presentation.

As explained in the sixth episode, some of the birds were imprinted on a human and filmed from an ultralight plane; others were filmed with a helicopter drone. Some other footage resulted from tiny cameras being strapped to the backs of birds.



Episodes

Merchandise 
In the UK, a two-disc DVD was released on 26 March 2012, while the Blu-ray sets was released later month on 16 April 2012.

In United States and Canada, a two-disc DVD was released on 18 March 2014, and for Blu-ray Disc was released on 8 April 2014. It was distributed by BBC Warner.

References

External links 
 
 
 Earthflight on the Eden website

BBC television documentaries about science
2011 British television series debuts
2012 British television series endings
BBC high definition shows
English-language television shows
Discovery Channel original programming